Reggane District is a district of Adrar Province, Algeria. According to the 2008 census it has a population of 33,540.

Communes
The district is further divided into 2 communes:
Reggane
Sali

References

Districts of Adrar Province